The 1924 United States Senate election in Oklahoma took place on November 4, 1924. Incumbent Democratic Senator Robert Latham Owen declined to run for re-election. In a crowded Democratic primary, impeached former Governor Jack C. Walton won the party's nomination with a narrow plurality. In the general election, he faced businessman William B. Pine, the Republican nominee. Though Democratic presidential nominee John W. Davis narrowly won the state over President Calvin Coolidge, Walton's unpopularity and controversy caused Democrats to lose the seat; Pine defeated Walton in a landslide.

Democratic primary

Candidates
 Jack C. Walton, former Governor of Oklahoma
 Everette B. Howard, U.S. Congressman from Oklahoma's 1st congressional district
 Thomas Gore, former U.S. Senator
 C. J. Wrightsman, member of the state board of regents
 S. P. Freeling, former Oklahoma Attorney General

Results

Republican primary

Candidates
 William B. Pine, businessman
 Eugene Lorton, editor of the Tulsa World
 Hugh Scott, commander of the soldiers' memorial hospital
 C. B. Leedy, State Senator
 B. G. Bingham
 John G. Lieber

Results

Farmer–Labor Primary

Candidates
 George Wilson
 William L. Loe

Results

General election

Results

References

Oklahoma
1924
1924 Oklahoma elections